Saint Honestus was, according to Christian tradition, a disciple of Saturninus of Toulouse and a native of Nîmes.

Saturninus and Honestus evangelized in Spain, and Honestus was martyred at Pampeluna during the persecutions of Aurelian. Elaboration of this legend states that Honestus was a nobleman of Nîmes who was appointed "apostle to Navarre and the Basque Country."

Further elaboration of his legend states that at Pampeluna, he converted the senator Firmus and his family to Christianity, while Firmus's son, Saint Firminus, was christened by Saint Saturninus.  Variants of this legend state that Honestus baptized Firminus himself.

References

External links

St. Honestus
St. Honestus

Gallo-Roman saints
Saints from Hispania
People from Nemausus
3rd-century Christian martyrs
Year of birth unknown